Ne valjam (English: I'm Not Good) is the fourth studio album by Serbian singer Nataša Bekvalac. It was released in November 2010 under City Records. Ne valjam was announced on 26 September 2010 during Bekvalac's 30th birthday party. The album includes twelve tracks of predominately pop music. Ne valjam was sold in two series of 50,000 copies.

Promotion
The album was promoted with a performance of the song "Čistija" on Serbian MTV in December 2010, which saw a memorable altercation between Bekvalac and the show's host, actor Sergej Trifunović, caused by Trifunović's "inappropriate" introduction. An accompanying music video was released for the title track.

Track listing
Credits adopted from Discogs.

Release history

References

2010 albums